Percy Pig is a British brand of pig-shaped gummy raspberry, strawberry, cherry and grape-flavoured confectionery products made under licence in Germany by Katjes for Marks & Spencer which first appeared in stores in 1992.  More than £10,000,000 was grossed between June 2009 and 2010 in Percy Pig sales in Marks and Spencer's UK branches alone. They contain just under 3.5% fruit juice and since May 2022 have been suitable for vegans.

Until 2008, Percy Pig sweets were available in 100, 200, and 400 grams. The packaging has not changed size, but the middle size now contains 170 grams and the large size now contains 400 grams.

History

Percy Pig was created in 1992 and was sold in strawberry, blackcurrant and raspberry flavours.

After a brief hiatus from the shelves in 1997, the brand returned, and in 2008 the sweets made UK British Vogue's 2008 hot list at number 11 on the top style bible's 40 hottest people and trends to watch over the coming months.

A Percy Pig appreciation society has been set up on Facebook and currently has 250,000 members.

The Percy Pig character appeared in M&S's 2021 Christmas advert voiced by Tom Holland in his first speaking appearance.

In April 2022, a large fibreglass Percy Pig statue was installed on the roof of a newly-opened Marks and Spencer store in Stevenage, Hertfordshire, to remain there for a year.

Ingredients
Marks & Spencer Percy Pig sweets originally contained real pig in the form of pork gelatin. In 2011 a "Veggie Percy" range was launched, a vegetarian variety of Percy Pig sweets replacing the gelatin with beeswax and pea protein, with green ears to indicate they were vegetarian.

In 2016 M&S began using a new gelatine-free recipe for some other varieties of Percy Pig sweets, and from May 2019 all Percy Pig sweets were 100 per cent gelatin-free, instead using pectin. This relaunch of the range also saw a new logo and packaging designs across the range.

In 2022, beeswax was removed from the recipe, making the product vegan.

Variations

Following on from the success of the original Percy Pig sweets, new varieties, flavours and characters were introduced. Amongst the first were "Percy Pig & Pals", which besides Percy also contained a cow (cola flavour) and sheep (orange and strawberry flavour) and "Percy Piglets", which are smaller versions of the main sweets. Percy gained a girlfriend in Penny Pig in 2010, with her sweets being lemon flavoured.

Besides the sweet range itself, Percy Pig has expanded to fruit juices, fizzy drinks, chocolates, popcorn, biscuits, cakes, muffins, ice cream, dessert sauces and mince pies, amongst others. In 2020, Marks and Spencer relaunched a Percy Pig advent calendar after being discontinued in 2018 and 2019. Toys, books, socks, party equipment, bed linen and piggy banks are amongst the non-food items with the Percy Pig branding.

List of Percy Pig sweets
 Percy Pig
 Percy Pig Original Veggie (previously called "Veggie Percy")
 Reduced Sugar Percy Pig
 Percy Pig Piglets
 Phizzy Pig Tails
 Percy Pig and Pals
 Percy Pig Loves Penny (previously known as "Percy and Penny")
 Percy Pig Goes Globetrotting (previously known as "Globetrotting Percy")
 Percy Pig Fruity Chews
 Percy Pig Phizzy Chews
 Percy Pig Party Time

Seasonal variations
 Percy Pig Gets Spooky (previously known as "Pumpkin Percy"; Halloween themed sweets)
 Merry Percymas! (Christmas themed sweets)
 Percy Pig & His Festive Friends
 Percy Meets the Easter Bunny (Easter themed sweets)

Discontinued variations
 Rosy Noses
 Reversy Percy (foam ears and jelly faces)
 Percy's Pig Pen (Percy Pig sweets with household object-shaped sweets)
 Percy in a Twist (fizzy laces in a twist – vegetarian)
 Percy in the Pink (Percy Pig chocolate)
 Percy's Pig Sty
 Percy's Percynalities (Percy Pig sweets with differing faces)
 Percy's Family Mix (a mixture of Percy Pig, Penny Pig and the piglets)
 Percy's Parents

Other retailers 

Similar sweets are available from other retailers. One variation is "Eric the Elephant" produced by Sainsbury's. Tesco's line sports the "Cool Cats" name, while Asda has other similar products called "Stanley Snail" and "Fredrick Frog". Lidl has "Henry Hippo" sweets which are vegan. Poundland, a discount retailer, released their own version in 2019 called "Dinky Dogs", although these are not vegetarian.

Outside of the United Kingdom, similar products in other countries are the Canadian "Juiced Up" (introduced 2009), the German "Fred Ferkel", the Dutch "Katja Biggetjes", the French "Petit Cochon" (launched 2007) and the Australian "Peggy Pig and Pals" introduced in Coles Supermarkets in 2009.

See also
 Colin the Caterpillar
 List of Marks & Spencer brands

References

External links
 Percy Pig Gift Set from Marks and Spencer

Marks & Spencer
Brand name confectionery
Products introduced in 1992
Fictional pigs